The bicolored-spined porcupine (Coendou bicolor) is a species of nocturnal and arboreal rodent in the family Erethizontidae.
It is found in Bolivia, Colombia, Ecuador, and Peru.

The head and body of Coendou bicolor measure about 543 mm, and another 481 mm is tail.  The body is covered with dense spines, pale yellow at the base and black-tipped, and significantly darker on the midback.  The bicolored-spined porcupine has a fully prehensile tail that is primarily free of spines.

References

Coendou
Mammals of the Andes
Mammals of Bolivia
Mammals of Colombia
Mammals of Ecuador
Mammals of Peru
Mammals described in 1844
Taxonomy articles created by Polbot